Robert John Little (8 July 1930 – 18 January 2017) was a Scottish footballer who played as a defender for Queen's Park, Rangers, Morton and the Scotland national team.

Football career
Little was born in Calgary, Alberta, but grew up in Scotland in Millport, Isle of Cumbrae. He started his career with Queen's Park, making 55 league appearances. He joined Rangers in 1951, and he made a total of 275 appearances, scoring once. His only ever goal for the club came in a 1–1 draw with Hamilton Academical in March 1954. During his time at Ibrox he won two League championships in 1952–53 and 1955–56 (he made insufficient appearances in two other title-winning seasons) and two Scottish Cups in 1953 and 1960. He left Rangers at the end of the 1961–62 season, moving to Morton, where he finished his career.

Little won one cap for the Scotland national team, against Sweden in 1953. Little also played for the Scottish League XI twice.

Post playing career
Little went on to teach physical education at St Columba's Greenock in the late 1960s and at the Sacred Heart Secondary in Paisley in the early 1970s. He died on 18 January 2017, aged 86.

See also
 List of Scotland international footballers born outside Scotland

References

External links 
 

1930 births
2017 deaths
Scottish footballers
Association football fullbacks
Soccer players from Calgary
Queen's Park F.C. players
Rangers F.C. players
Greenock Morton F.C. players
Scotland international footballers
Canadian people of Scottish descent
Scottish Football League players
Sportspeople from Scottish islands
Scottish Football League representative players
Canadian emigrants to Scotland
Footballers from North Ayrshire
Place of death missing
Scotland amateur international footballers